Pinnayur may refer to:

Pinayur, a village in Uthiramerur taluk, Kanchipuram district, Tamil Nadu, India
Pinnayur East,a village in Thiruvonam taluk of Thanjavur district, Tamil Nadu.
Pinnayur West, a village in Thiruvonam taluk of Thanjavur district, Tamil Nadu